Le Butcherettes is a Mexican garage punk band formed in 2007 in Guadalajara by Teri Gender Bender.

History 
Le Butcherettes was created by vocalist/guitarist Teri Gender Bender, who later recruited drummer Auryn Jolene to form a duo. Their live act, featuring 1950s fashions and props such as brooms, feather dusters, and bloody aprons to refer to women being slaves, quickly achieved acclaim in the Mexican underground scene. Teri Gender Bender would also use artificial blood, flour, eggs, meat, and a real pig head on stage.

The band won "Best New Artist" and "Best Punk Record" in the Indie-O Awards 2009. A disagreement on direction led Auryn Jolene to abruptly leave and claim the end of the band, leading to media confusion. Teri Gender Bender later denied this. Gender Bender moved the band to Los Angeles and recruited drummer Normandi Heuxdalfo. Notable 2009 appearances include Hellow Fest in Monterrey and opening for The Dead Weather in their Mexico City and Guadalajara shows. In January 2010, Le Butcherettes opened for the Yeah Yeah Yeahs at shows in Monterrey, Guadalajara and Mexico City.

Omar Rodriguez-Lopez of The Mars Volta produced (as well as contributed bass guitar to) Le Butcherettes' LP, Sin Sin Sin. The first single, "Henry Don't Got Love", was released in 2010 as a free download from Le Butcherettes' Bandcamp page. The album was released in May 2011 on Rodriguez-Lopez's label.

Le Butcherettes toured the U.S. with Deftones and The Dillinger Escape Plan with the new line-up of Teri, drummer Gabe Serbian (of The Locust) and bassist Jonathan Hischke; Le Butcherettes later played support for Queens of the Stone Age.

They toured Europe with The Mars Volta and North America with Rodriguez-Lopez's new project Antemasque in 2014 and 2015. The record Cry Is for the Flies was released in America by Ipecac Recordings, and gained a further following with extensive touring with the Melvins.

In June 2015 the band announced that their album A Raw Youth would be released September 18, 2015 and produced by Omar Rodriguez-Lopez; it has guest appearances from John Frusciante and Iggy Pop.

Between August and September 2017, the band posted several photos on social media featuring the recording sessions for a new album, somewhere in Northern California. This was later confirmed to have taken place in Stinson Beach. The new album was expected to be released in October 2018, but was eventually released on February 1, 2019, titled bi/MENTAL.

In 2018 the band appeared as a part of the Flaming Lips North America tour. Le Butcherettes also guested on the Adult Swim television series FishCenter Live. In 2019 the band played shows with L7 On a North American tour, as well as a show with Bikini Kill.

Band members 
Teri Gender Bender – vocals, guitars, keyboards (2007–present)
Riko Rodríguez-López – bass (2015–2017), guitars, synths (2016–present), trumpet on "Your Weakness Gives Me Life" (2014)
Alejandra Robles Luna – drums (2016–present)
Marfred Rodríguez-López – bass (2017–present)

Past band members
 Auryn Jolene – drums (2007–2009)
 Normandi Heuxdaflo – drums (2009–2010)
 Casanova Vega – bass (2009–2010)
 Carlos Om – bass (2010)
 Jonathan Hischke – bass (2011)
 Gabe Serbian – drums (2011)(Died 2022)
 Omar Rodríguez-López – bass (2011–2013), production
 Lia Braswell – drums (2011–2014)
 Chris Common – bass (2014), drums (2015–2016, 2017)
 Jamie Aaron Aux – bass, backing vocals (2015)

Timeline

Discography 
Albums
Sin Sin Sin (May 10, 2011)
Cry Is for the Flies (May 15, 2014)
A Raw Youth (September 18, 2015)
bi/MENTAL (February 1, 2019)

Singles and EPs
Kiss & Kill EP (2008)
iTunes Live: SXSW EP (2011)
Chaos as Usual (split with Melvins) EP (2015)
"Shave the Pride" 7" (2015)
House Hunter flexi-disc (2016)
spider/WAVES (2018)
struggle/STRUGGLE flexi-disc (2018)
Don't Bleed (February 14, 2020)

Downloads
"Sólo Soy Pueblo (Llanto)" (2015)
"My Mother Holds My Only Life Line" (2016)

References

External links 
 Official site

Garage rock groups
Ipecac Recordings artists
Mexican indie rock groups
Musical groups from Guadalajara, Jalisco
Musical groups established in 2007
Rise Records artists
Rock en Español music groups